Sorbia is a genus of longhorn beetles of the subfamily Lamiinae, containing the following species:

 Sorbia affinis Breuning, 1964
 Sorbia laterialba Breuning, 1939
 Sorbia sericans Breuning, 1948
 Sorbia tarsalis Pascoe, 1865

References

Mesosini